The Merrimack Warriors represented Merrimack College in the Women's Hockey East Association during the 2020–21 NCAA Division I women's ice hockey season.

Regular season
On January 23, 2021, freshman Aries Mustoe recorded 28 saves in her NCAA debut, a 4-0 loss versus the New Hampshire Wildcats.

Standings

Schedule

Source:
|-
!colspan=12 style=""| Regular Season
|-

Roster

2020–21 Warriors

Awards and honors
Emma Gorski, HEA Defensive Player of the Week (awarded December 14, 2020) 
 Julia MacLean, Runner-up to the 2021 Hockey East Association's Sportsmanship Award

References

Merrimack Warriors
Merrimack Warriors women's ice hockey seasons
Merrimack Warriors
Merrimack Warriors